Eliezer ben Isaac ben-Arhah was a rabbi in Hebron from about 1615 until his death in 1652. He also resided for some time in Safed and Gaza. His responsa, containing questions from all over Palestine and beyond, demonstrate the wide acceptance of his authority. They also reveal much detail about the lives of the Jews living in the Land of Israel at the time. In 1978 they were published.

References

Rabbis in Hebron
Rabbis in Safed
People from Gaza City
17th-century rabbis from the Ottoman Empire
Sephardi rabbis in Ottoman Palestine